Yankton High School is a public high school in Yankton, South Dakota, United States. It serves students in grades 9-12 for Yankton School District 63-3.

Notable alumni
 Tom Brokaw, news anchor
 Leroy V. Grosshuesch, World War II flying ace
 Ray Hamann, professional basketball player
 Colton Iverson, professional basketball player
 Lillian Case Russell, silent movie screenwriter
 Layne Somsen, Major League Baseball pitcher.

References

External links

Public high schools in South Dakota
Buildings and structures in Yankton, South Dakota
Schools in Yankton County, South Dakota